Ampary is a town and commune in Madagascar. It belongs to the district of Soavinandriana, which is a part of Itasy Region. The population of the commune was estimated to be approximately 9,000 in 2001 commune census.

Only primary schooling is available. The majority 80% of the population of the commune are farmers, while an additional 17% receives their livelihood from raising livestock. The most important crop is beans, while other important products are maize, cassava and tomato. Services provide employment for 2% of the population. Additionally fishing employs 1% of the population.

References and notes 

Populated places in Itasy Region